The Blue Sea and You is a 1959 West German romantic comedy film directed by Thomas Engel and starring Fred Bertelmann, Karin Dor and Renate Ewert.

The film's art direction was by Wolf Englert and Ernst Richter. It was shot at Berlin's Spandau Studios with location shooting taking place in Montenegro and Mostar.

Cast
 Karin Dor as Helga Heidebrink
 Renate Ewert as Suzy
 Chris Howland as Christopher Greenwood
 Ursula Herking as Fräulein Spätlieb
 Hans Nielsen as Direktor Heidebrink
 Stanislav Ledinek as Der Bärtige
 Eduard Wandrey
 Kurt Weitkamp
 Petar Spajic-Suljo
 Käte Jaenicke
 Ada Witzke
 Kurt Pratsch-Kaufmann
 Klaus Becker

References

Bibliography 
 Bock, Hans-Michael & Bergfelder, Tim. The Concise CineGraph. Encyclopedia of German Cinema. Berghahn Books, 2009.

External links 
 

1959 films
1959 romantic comedy films
1959 musical comedy films
German romantic comedy films
German musical comedy films
West German films
1950s German-language films
Films directed by Thomas Engel
Films about vacationing
Films shot at Spandau Studios
1950s German films